Li Landi (born 2 September 1999), also known as Landy Li, is a Chinese actress, singer and model of Hui ethnicity. She also starred in 2019 Chinese film Adoring. She is best known for her roles in the dramas  My Huckleberry Friends  (2017), Wu Xin: The Monster Killer 2 (2017), Never Gone  (2018), Dreaming Back to the Qing Dynasty (2019), and Don't Disturb My Study (2021). In 2009, 10-year-old Li Landi made her film debut in "Who Did You Lose To", and thus set foot in the film and television industry. Li was enrolled in the Central Academy of Drama in 2018, after placing second in the National Higher Education Entrance Examination.

Early life

Li Landi, born in Beijing on September 2, 1999, in a Chinese Hui family, is a film and television actress in Mainland China.
In 2009, 10-year-old Li Landi made her film debut in Who Did You Lose To, and thus set foot in the film and television industry. In 2013, starred in the Osmanthus fragrans in the action film Fuchun Mountain Residence. In 2015, she co-starred with Zhu Zixiao in the urban love drama Shining Mingtian. In 2016, she appeared in Yaoyao, a kind girl in the urban love idol drama Fatal Love; in June, she won the most potential child actress award for her children's inspirational movie Junior Chess King [1] .

In 2017, she was recognized by her audience as Su Tao, who played a simple and passionate role in Wuxin Master II. In the same year, she won the iQiyi Screaming Night Newcomer of the Year Award for her youth campus drama My Huckleberry Friends.

On October 17, 2019, Li Landi was selected into the 2019 Forbes China Under 30 Elite List.

Li was enrolled in the Central Academy of Drama in 2018, after placing second in the National Higher Education Entrance Examination.

Career
Li debuted at the age of 10, starring in the movie Aini Shugeleshui.

Li first gained attention with her role in the family drama Chinese Style Relationship (2016). The following year, she took on lead roles in the youth drama All About Secrets and Wu Xin: The Monster Killer 2, which gained her increased recognition. Li subsequently appeared in the campus drama My Huckleberry Friends as Yu Zhouzhou, and romance drama Never Gone as the younger version of the female protagonist; receiving positive reviews for her performance.

In 2019, Li starred in the historical romance drama Dreaming Back to the Qing Dynasty. The same year she starred in the romance comedy film Adoring. Forbes China listed Li under their 30 Under 30 Asia 2019 list which consisted of 30 influential people under 30 years old who have had a substantial effect in their fields.

In June 2020, Li was cast in youth drama Don't Disturb My Study as the main lead, Nan Xiangwan alongside Lai Kuan-lin as Lin Xiaoran.

On 5 August 2020, it was confirmed that Li Landi will be starring opposite Niu Junfeng in Chess Love.

Filmography

Film

Television series

Variety show

Discography

Awards

References

External links 
 

1999 births
Living people
Central Academy of Drama alumni
Actresses from Beijing
Chinese film actresses
Chinese television actresses
21st-century Chinese actresses
Chinese child actresses
Tangren Media
Hui singers
Hui actresses
People from Beijing